La Plonge 192 is an Indian reserve of the English River First Nation in Saskatchewan. It is 19 kilometres south of Île-à-la-Crosse. In the 2016 Canadian Census, it recorded a population of 148 living in 46 of its 51 total private dwellings. In the same year, its Community Well-Being index was calculated at 59 of 100, compared to 58.4 for the average First Nations community and 77.5 for the average non-Indigenous community.

References

Indian reserves in Saskatchewan
Division No. 18, Saskatchewan